Adri van Heteren  (born 5 October 1951 in Gouda) is a Dutch Christian minister in the Christian Reformed Churches and a politician. He has been chairperson of the Reformed Political Party (SGP) since 28 February 2004.

Van Heteren was a minister in Werkendam, and Barendrecht. Since 2000 he has been a minister in Urk.

Electoral history

References
↑ Predikanten, Christelijke Gereformeerde Kerken in Nederland
↑ SGP - voorzitters, Documentatiecentrum Nederlandse Politieke Partijen van de Rijksuniversiteit Groningen

1951 births
Living people
20th-century Dutch Calvinist and Reformed ministers
21st-century Dutch Calvinist and Reformed ministers
Chairmen of the Reformed Political Party
Christian Reformed Churches Christians from the Netherlands
People from Barendrecht
People from Gouda, South Holland
People from Urk
People from Werkendam
Reformed Political Party politicians